The Vernal Tithing Office is a historic building in Vernal, Utah. It was built in 1887 by Harley Mowery as a tithing building for the Church of Jesus Christ of Latter-day Saints.  It is a gable-front building with some elements of Greek Revival architectural style. It has been listed on the National Register of Historic Places since January 25, 1985.

References

National Register of Historic Places in Uintah County, Utah
Greek Revival architecture in Utah
Religious buildings and structures completed in 1887
Tithing buildings of the Church of Jesus Christ of Latter-day Saints
1887 establishments in Utah Territory